This is a list of the number-one hits of 1973 on Italian Hit Parade Singles Chart.

Number-one artists

See also
1973 in music

References

1973 in Italian music
Italy
1973